The Matron Stakes is an American Thoroughbred horse race held annually during the fall season at Belmont Park, the New York Racing Association (NYRA) track in Elmont, Long Island, New York. It is open to two-year-old fillies and is the filly counterpart to the Belmont Futurity Stakes.

The Matron Stakes was run over a straight course before 1959, with the exception of 1941. Always a race for two-year-old horses, it has been run under different conditions four times:
 1892–1901 : on dirt, open to both colts and fIllies
 1902–1914 : on dirt, a division for colts and geldings and a division for fillies 
 1915–2017 : on dirt, for fillies only
 2018–present : on turf, for fillies only

The inaugural race took place at Morris Park Racecourse in The Bronx, New York where it remained until 1905 when it was moved to the new Belmont Park. Through special arrangements, in 1910 it was hosted by Pimlico Race Course in Baltimore, Maryland. The NYRA's Aqueduct Racetrack hosted the event in 1960 and again from 1962 to 1968.

There was no race held from 1895 to 1898 and as a result of the passage of New York state's Hart–Agnew Law that banned parimutuel wagering, from 1911 to 1913. The race was placed on hiatus from 1915 to 1922. When it was revived in 1923 as part of the Belmont Park schedule, the Matron was won by the Greentree Stable filly Tree Top who beat twelve other competitors. Runnerup Nellie Morse went on to win the 1924 Preakness Stakes and earn American Champion Three-Year-Old Filly honors. The third-place finisher, Princess Doreen, would have a career that saw her win three National Championships and induction into the National Museum of Racing and Hall of Fame.

In 2001 the race was cancelled in observance of the September 11, 2001 attacks on the World Trade Center in New York City.

Records
Speed  record: (At distance of 7 furlongs)
 1:22.80 – Meadow Star (1990)

Most wins by a jockey:
 6 – Ángel Cordero Jr. (1974, 1980, 1983, 1987, 1989, 1991)

Most wins by a trainer:
 9 – D. Wayne Lukas (1983, 1984, 1987, 1988, 1989, 1994, 1995, 1996, 2005)

Most wins by an owner:
 7 – H. P. Whitney (1905 (2), 1907, 1909, 1910, 1926, 1929)

Winners

 † In 1994, Flanders finished first but was disqualified.
 †† In 1947, Bewitch finished first but was disqualified.

References

1892 establishments in New York (state)
Horse races in New York (state)
Belmont Park
Morris Park Racecourse
Flat horse races for two-year-old fillies
Graded stakes races in the United States
Recurring sporting events established in 1892